John Attwood (died 1865) was a British Conservative and Peelite politician.

Attwood was elected as the Conservative Member of Parliament (MP) for Harwich at the 1841 general election and, becoming a Peelite by 1847, held the seat until 1848 when he was unseated on petition due to bribery by his agents.

References

External links
 

1865 deaths
UK MPs 1841–1847
UK MPs 1847–1852
Conservative Party (UK) MPs for English constituencies